Franz-Josef Selig (born 11 July 1962) is a German operatic bass.

Career 
Born in Mayen, Selig studied at the Musikhochschule Köln, first church music, later voice. During his studies already, he was accepted in 1989 as a member of the Aalto-Theater, the opera of Essen, where he stayed until 1995. He performed as a guest at notable opera houses in Germany, in Europe and the US, such as the Vienna State Opera, the Royal Opera House in London, La Scala, the Hamburg State Opera, both Opéra Bastille and Théâtre du Châtelet in Paris, the Metropolitan Opera, La Monnaie in Brussels, Deutsche Oper Berlin, Bavarian State Opera, Frankfurt Opera and the Opéra National de Lyon. He focused on roles by Richard Wagner such as Marke in Tristan und Isolde and Gurnemanz  in Parsifal. His roles have also included Sarastro in Mozart's Die Zauberflöte, Osmin in his Die Entführung aus dem Serail, Rocco in Beethoven's Fidelio, and Fiesco in Verdi's Simon Boccanegra.

In 2007, Selig sang the Bruckner Te Deum with the WDR Symphony Orchestra Cologne, WDR Rundfunkchor Köln, NDR Chor, under the direction of Sir Gilbert Levine. The concert, which was performed in Cologne Cathedral was broadcast by the Westdeutscher Rundfunk (West German television), 3sat and on PBS stations nationwide in the U.S.

Selig made his debut at the Bayreuth Festival in 2012 as Daland in Der fliegende Holländer. 

In 2013, he added there the role of Hunding in Die Walküre. In the 2013/14 season, he first performed in Handel's Agrippina, and in Toulouse in Daphne by Richard Strauss. He has also performed recitals of Lieder.

Awards 
 1992: Aalto-Bühnenpreis für junge Künstler
 2012: Kulturpreis der Stadt Neuwied
 2013: Honorary member of the Koblenz Richard-Wagner-Verband

External links 
 
 
 Biografie KünstlerSekretariat am Gasteig

References 

1962 births
Living people
People from Mayen
German operatic basses
20th-century German  male  singers
21st-century German  male opera singers
Hochschule für Musik und Tanz Köln alumni